The Union Chapel School and Shop Building is a historic school complex in rural Conway County, Arkansas. It consists of three buildings: a classroom, shop building, and pump house. The classroom building is a stone single-story structure, with a gable roof, and bands of sash windows flanking the main entrance, which is set in a rounded-arch opening. The shop building is also stone, and is covered by a hip roof. The shop building was one of several built on the grounds in the late 1920s with funding from the Rosenwald Fund, and is the only one from that period to survive. The classroom building was built in 1937–38 with funding from the Works Progress Administration, replacing one of the Rosenwald buildings that had burned down.

The building was listed on the National Register of Historic Places in 2016.

Gallery

See also
National Register of Historic Places listings in Conway County, Arkansas

References

School buildings on the National Register of Historic Places in Arkansas
School buildings completed in 1938
Buildings and structures in Conway County, Arkansas